Gymnopilus rugulosus is a species of mushroom in the family Hymenogastraceae.

Phylogeny
This species is in the spectabilis-imperialis infrageneric grouping of the genus Gymnopilus.

See also

List of Gymnopilus species

References

External links
Gymnopilus rugulosus at Index Fungorum

rugulosus